3β-Hydroxysteroid dehydrogenase/Δ5-4 isomerase (3β-HSD) is an enzyme that catalyzes the biosynthesis of the steroid progesterone from pregnenolone, 17α-hydroxyprogesterone from 17α-hydroxypregnenolone, and androstenedione from dehydroepiandrosterone (DHEA) in the adrenal gland. It is the only enzyme in the adrenal pathway of corticosteroid synthesis that is not a member of the cytochrome P450 family. It is also present in other steroid-producing tissues, including the ovary, testis and placenta.  In humans, there are two 3β-HSD isozymes encoded by the HSD3B1 and HSD3B2 genes.

3β-HSD is also known as delta Δ5-4-isomerase, which catalyzes the oxidative conversion of Δ5-3β-hydroxysteroids to the Δ4-3-keto configuration and is, therefore, essential for the biosynthesis of all classes of hormonal steroids, namely progesterone, glucocorticoids, mineralocorticoids, androgens, and estrogens.

The 3β-HSD complex is responsible for the conversion of:

 Pregnenolone to progesterone
 17α-Hydroxypregnenolone to 17α-hydroxyprogesterone
 DHEA to androstenedione
 Androstenediol to testosterone
 Androstadienol to androstadienone

Reaction
3β-HSD belongs to the family of oxidoreductases, to be specific, those acting on the CH-OH group with NAD+ or NADP+ as acceptor. This enzyme participates in C21-steroid hormone metabolism and androgen and estrogen metabolism.

3β-HSD catalysis|catalyzes the chemical reaction:

a 3β-hydroxy-Δ5-steroid + NAD+  a 3-oxo-Δ5-steroid + NADH + H+

Thus, the two substrates of this enzyme are 3β-hydroxy-Δ5-steroid and NAD+, whereas its three products are 3-oxo-Δ5-steroid, NADH, and H+.

Isozymes
Humans express two 3β-HSD isozymes, HSD3B1 (type I) and HSD3B2 (type II). The type I isoenzyme is expressed in placenta and peripheral tissues, whereas the type II 3β-HSD isoenzyme is expressed in the adrenal gland, ovary, and testis.

Nomenclature
The systematic name of this enzyme class is 3β-hydroxy-Δ5-steroid:NAD+ 3-oxidoreductase. Other names in common use include:

 progesterone reductase
 Δ5-3β-hydroxysteroid dehydrogenase
 3β-hydroxy-5-ene steroid dehydrogenase
 3β-hydroxy steroid dehydrogenase/isomerase
 3β-hydroxy-Δ5-C27-steroid dehydrogenase/isomerase
 3β-hydroxy-Δ5-C27-steroid oxidoreductase
 3β-hydroxy-5-ene-steroid oxidoreductase
 steroid-Δ5-3β-ol dehydrogenase
 3β-HSDH
 5-ene-3β-hydroxysteroid dehydrogenase
 3β-hydroxy-5-ene-steroid dehydrogenase

Inhibitors
3β-HSD is potently inhibited by azastene, cyanoketone, epostane, and trilostane. Medroxyprogesterone acetate and medrogestone are weak inhibitors of 3β-HSD which may substantially inhibit it at high dosages.

Biosynthetic pathway

Clinical significance
A deficiency in the type II form through mutations in HSD3B2 is responsible for a rare form of congenital adrenal hyperplasia. No human condition has yet been linked to a deficiency in the type I enzyme. Its importance in placental progesterone production expression suggests that such a mutation would be embryonically lethal.

The fetal adrenal cortex lacks expression of the enzyme early on, thus mineralocorticoids (e.g. aldosterone) and glucocorticoids (e.g. cortisol) cannot be synthesized. This is significant because cortisol induces type II pneumocytes of the lungs to synthesize and secrete pulmonary surfactant; without pulmonary surfactant to reduce the alveolar surface tension, premature neonates may die of neonatal respiratory distress syndrome. If delivery is unavoidable (e.g. because of placental abruption, or pre-eclampsia/HELLP syndrome), then glucocorticoids (e.g. cortisol) can be administered.

See also
 Steroidogenic enzyme
 3α-Hydroxysteroid dehydrogenase

References

Further reading

 
 
 

EC 1.1.1
NADH-dependent enzymes
Enzymes of unknown structure